Jude Victor William Bellingham (born 29 June 2003) is an English professional footballer who plays as a midfielder for Bundesliga club Borussia Dortmund and the England national team.

He joined Borussia Dortmund in July 2020, and in his first competitive match became their youngest ever goalscorer.

He represented England at under-15, under-16, under-17 and under-21 levels. He made his first appearance for the senior team in November 2020, and represented the country at UEFA Euro 2020 and the 2022 FIFA World Cup.

Early life
Jude Victor William Bellingham was born on 29 June 2003 in Stourbridge, in the Metropolitan Borough of Dudley, West Midlands, the eldest son of Denise and Mark Bellingham. His father Mark was until 2022 a sergeant in the West Midlands Police and was a prolific goalscorer in non-League football. Bellingham's younger brother, Jobe, is a Birmingham City player. Bellingham attended Priory School in Edgbaston, Birmingham.

Club career

Birmingham City
Bellingham joined Birmingham City as an under-8, after playing for Stourbridge. He played for their under-18 team at 14, and made his debut for their under-23 team at the age of 15, on 15 October 2018 away to Nottingham Forest's U23s. Entering the game after an hour, he scored the only goal in the 87th minute "sliding in to force the ball over the goal line after pressure by Kyle McFarlane on the keeper diverted the ball into his path." By March 2019, he had three goals from ten development squad appearances, had featured in FourFourTwo list of the "50 most exciting teenagers in English football", and was mentioned as of interest to major European clubs. He was gradually introduced to the first-team environment while still a schoolboy: increasingly training with the seniors, he accompanied them on matchday to observe, and travelled as the "19th man" for a Championship match in March.

Bellingham took up a two-year scholarship with Birmingham City to begin in July 2019. He was part of the first-team training camp in Portugal, played and scored in pre-season friendlies, and was given squad number 22 for the 2019–20 season. On 6 August, when he started the EFL Cup first round visit to Portsmouth, Bellingham became Birmingham City's youngest ever first-team player. At , he lowered the record set by Trevor Francis in 1970 by 101 days. He played for 80 minutes in the 3–0 defeat, and was the Birmingham Mail man of the match. He made his first Football League appearance 19 days later, as a second-half substitute in a 3–0 defeat away to Swansea City, and his home debut on 31 August against Stoke City. Replacing the injured Jefferson Montero after half an hour, Bellingham scored the winneralbeit via a generous deflectionas Birmingham came back from 1–0 down to beat Stoke 2–1, and thus became their youngest ever goalscorer, aged 16 years and 63 days. He started the next match, away to Charlton Athletic two weeks later, and scored the only goal from Kerim Mrabti's cutback.

Bellingham continued as a permanent fixture in the matchday squad, sometimes as a substitute but mainly in the starting eleven. He was eased into the team on the left wing, moved into central midfield "where he could gain more confidence", and then used "in a more advanced role" once the staff were sure he could cope with the responsibility. He was EFL Young Player of the Month for November 2019. According to head coach Pep Clotet, Bellingham himself "feels more comfortable in midfield, and more comfortable when he can get closer to the opposition box."

He was linked with moves to numerous major clubs in January 2020; on deadline day, Birmingham were reported to have turned down a £20 million bid from Manchester United. Bellingham continued as a first-team regular, and by the time the season was suspended because of the COVID-19 pandemic, he had made 32 league appearances. He remained an integral part of the team once the season resumed behind closed doors, and set up a late equaliser for Lukas Jutkiewicz against Charlton Athletic that made Birmingham's league position less precarious with two matches still to play. He finished the season with four goals from 44 appearances in all competitions, 41 in the league, as Birmingham avoided relegation despite losing the last match of the season. In appreciation of what Bellingham achieved in such a short time with the first team, the club announced that they would retire his number 22 shirt, "to remember one of our own and to inspire others." At the EFL Awards, he was named both Championship Apprentice of the Year and EFL Young Player of the Season.

Borussia Dortmund
It had long become obvious that Bellingham would leave Birmingham, and it was reported that he and his father had visited several major clubs, of which Manchester United and Bundesliga club Borussia Dortmund were the favourites. Impressed by Dortmund's record of including young players as regulars in the first team, as evidenced by the likes of Jadon Sancho, that became his destination of choice. He flew to Germany for a medical, and the transfer was confirmed on 20 July 2020: he would join after Birmingham's last match of the season. The undisclosed fee was understood by Sky Sports to be an initial £25 millionmaking him the most expensive 17-year-old in historyplus "several million more" dependent on performance-related criteria.

Bellingham made his debut on 14 September 2020, starting the first match of Dortmund's 2020–21 season against third-tier MSV Duisburg in the DFB-Pokal, aged . After half an hour, he scored the second goal in a 5–0 win, becoming the club's youngest goalscorer in the DFB-Pokal, taking six days off Giovanni Reyna's record, as well as their youngest scorer in any competitive match, breaking Nuri Şahin's record by five days. Five days later, he marked his league debut with the assist for Reyna's opening goal in a 3–0 win over Borussia Mönchengladbach, and was named as Bundesliga Rookie of the Month for September. When Bellingham faced Lazio in the group stage on 20 October, aged 17 years and 113 days, he became the youngest Englishman to start a Champions League match, breaking the record previously set by Phil Foden.

In the first three months of the season, Bellingham was a regular in all competitions, with six starts and seven substitute appearances in the Bundesliga as well as four Champions League starts. He missed the first two matches of 2021 with a foot injury, but returned to action as an increasingly regular starter. He was involved in Marco Reus's goal in the away leg of the Champions League quarter-final against Manchester City He scored against Man City early in the second leg, but Dortmund could not retain their away-goal advantage. In between, Bellingham scored his first Bundesliga goal from Reyna's knock-down to equalise with VfB Stuttgart early in the second half; Dortmund won 3–2. Bellingham started for Dortmund in their 4–1 victory over RB Leipzig in the 2021 DFB-Pokal Final. He was booked in the first half and replaced by Thorgan Hazard at half-time with his team 3–0 ahead. He finished the season with 29 appearances and one goal in the Bundesliga, 46 appearances and four goals in all competitions, and was voted Newcomer of the Season by his fellow players.

Bellingham was runner-up to Pedri of Barcelona in the 2021 Kopa Trophy, awarded to the best under-21 male player as voted by previous winners of the Ballon d'Or. On 4 December, Bellingham played in Der Klassiker against Bayern Munich. He made the assists for both Dortmund goals, but Bayern won the match 3–2 via a 77th-minute penalty awarded after lengthy VAR involvement. Earlier in the fixture, two Dortmund penalty appeals were turned down by referee Felix Zwayer, who refused to review either. Interviewed live by Viaplay immediately after the match, Bellingham was critical of Zwayer's decisions, and made reference to his part in the 2005 German football match-fixing scandal, saying: "You give a referee, that has match fixed before, the biggest game in Germany. What do you expect?" The DFB wrote to Bellingham asking for his comments as a matter of urgency. He was later fined €40,000 by the German Football Association.

International career
Bellingham was eligible to play for his native England and also for the Republic of Ireland, for which he qualified via a grandparent. He made his England under-15 debut against Turkey in December 2016. In recognition of his captaining that team during the 2017–18 season, he was presented with a Special Achievement Award at the 2018 Birmingham City Academy awards night. By the end of 2018 he had made his first appearance for the England under-16 team, and went on to feature in eleven games, score four goals, and captain the team. He was included in England's under-17 squad for the Syrenka Cup, a friendly tournament held in September 2019 in preparation for the 2020 European Championship qualifiers the following March. He made his debut as a substitute in England's opening match of the tournament, a 5–0 win over Finland in which he scored the third goal, and captained the team in their second fixture, in which they came back from a goal behind to beat Austria 4–2 and qualify for the final. Again, Bellingham scored the third goal. He retained the captaincy for the final, in which England beat hosts Poland on penalties following a 2–2 draw, and was named player of the tournament. 

Bellingham received his first call-up to the under-21 squad for European Championship qualifiers against Kosovo and Austria in September 2020. He became the youngest player to appear for England U21 when he came on to replace Tom Davies after 62 minutes of the match against Kosovo on 4 September with England 3–0 ahead, and scored after 85 minutes to complete the 6–0 victory.

In November 2020, after James Ward-Prowse and Trent Alexander-Arnold withdrew through injury, Bellingham was called up to the England senior squad for the first time. He made his debut in a friendly against the Republic of Ireland at Wembley on 12 November, replacing Mason Mount after 73 minutes of a 3–0 win. At , he became England's third-youngest full international; only Theo Walcott and Wayne Rooney had appeared at a younger age. Bellingham was named in the England squad for the UEFA Euro 2020 tournament, which was delayed until June 2021 because of the COVID-19 pandemic. When he came on as an 82nd-minute substitute in England's opening match, a 1–0 win over Croatia at Wembley on 13 June, aged 17 years and 349 days, he became both the youngest Englishman to play at any major tournament and the youngest of any nationality to play at a European Championship; the latter record was broken by Poland's Kacper Kozłowski just six days later.

Bellingham's first senior international goal, a header from Luke Shaw's cross to open the scoring in England's 6–2 win over Iran in their first game of the 2022 World Cup on 21 November 2022, made him the second youngest scorer for England at a World Cup. He also made the run and pass to Harry Kane who crossed for Raheem Sterling to score England's third goal, and played the through ball from which Callum Wilson set up their sixth for Jack Grealish. He then followed this up during the last 16 game against Senegal with a run through Senegal's defence, assisting Jordan Henderson's goal in the 38th minute. He then played a key role in Harry Kane's goal in the 3rd minute of stoppage time in the first half, setting up Phil Foden to make the assist.

Career statistics

Club

International

England score listed first, score column indicates score after each Bellingham goal

Honours
Borussia Dortmund
 DFB-Pokal: 2020–21

England U17
 Syrenka Cup: 2019

England
UEFA European Championship runner-up: 2020

Individual
 Birmingham City Under-15/16 Goal of the Season: 2018
 Birmingham City Special Achievement Award: 2018
 Syrenka Cup Player of the Tournament: 2019
 EFL Young Player of the Month: November 2019
 Birmingham City Young Player of the Year: 2019–20
 EFL Young Player of the Season: 2019–20
 Championship Apprentice of the Year: 2019–20
 Bundesliga Rookie of the Month: September 2020
 Bundesliga Goal of the Month: October 2021
 VDV Bundesliga Newcomer of the Season: 2020–21
 VDV Bundesliga Team of the Season: 2021–22
 Kopa Trophy runner-up: 2021
 Goal NXGN: 2022
 IFFHS Men's World's Best Youth Player: 2022

References

External links

 Profile at the Borussia Dortmund website
 Profile at the Football Association website
 

2003 births
Living people
Sportspeople from Stourbridge
Footballers from the West Midlands (county)
English footballers
English people of Irish descent
Association football midfielders
Birmingham City F.C. players
Borussia Dortmund players
English Football League players
Bundesliga players
England youth international footballers
England under-21 international footballers
England international footballers
UEFA Euro 2020 players
2022 FIFA World Cup players
English expatriate footballers
Expatriate footballers in Germany
English expatriate sportspeople in Germany
Black British sportsmen